Pyankovia is a genus of flowering plants belonging to the family Amaranthaceae.

Its native range is Crimea to Mongolia and Afghanistan.

Species:

Pyankovia affinis 
Pyankovia brachiata 
Pyankovia roborowskii

References

Amaranthaceae
Amaranthaceae genera